= Ecobriga =

Town of ancient Galatia

Coordinates: 39°59′37″N 33°43′06″E

Ecobriga or Ecobrogis was a town in ancient Galatia that was inhabited during Roman and Byzantine times.

Its site is located near Sorsovus, Asiatic Turkey.
